Ronny Jiménez Mendonza (born 12 April 1989) is a Bolivian footballer playing for Sport Boys Warnes.

Club career
A player for Real Potosí since 2008, he joined the club at the age of 18 years. He has been capped more than 100 times for the Bolivian club. He is also the captain of the club.

International career
He made his debut for Bolivia in a friendly match against Guyana on 16 August 2012 playing the whole 90 minutes starting the match. He is also in the Bolivian squad for the World Cup qualifiers becoming an undisputed starter.

References

Association football defenders
1989 births
Living people
Bolivian footballers
Bolivia international footballers
Club Real Potosí players
The Strongest players
Nacional Potosí players
Club San José players
Club Aurora players
Sport Boys Warnes players